The United States version of Tiger Lily Records was a record label that was run by Roulette Records founder Morris Levy.  Purportedly it was a tax scam created by Levy and was never intended to make a profit.  Tiger Lily's primary modus operandi was to acquire demo tapes from artists or studios and then release them without the artists consent and sometimes without even the artist's knowledge. Other albums released by Tiger Lily have been identified as bootlegs of albums released in the early 1970s by Artie Ripp's Family Productions and two cases of performers who were actually signed to Tiger Lily Records have been identified. 

The most prominent artists known to have a record released by Tiger Lily were Richard Pryor, whose album L.A. Jail was released by Tiger Lily, and Rod Stewart, who had a live recording of him in performance at the 1973 Reading and Leeds Festivals released by Tiger Lily in 1976 under the title Reading Festival Featuring Rod Stewart.  The album credited to Stewart was really a collection of various artists from the Reading Festival, with Rod Stewart and the Faces only appearing on one track. The most expensive and best known Tiger Lily Records release is the album  "Stonewall" credited to a band of the same name. It has sold for as much as $14,100.

Along with Guinness Records, Tiger Lily was one of the major tax scam labels of the 1970s with around 70 albums being released. The types of albums released by Tiger Lily fell into several broad categories:

 Single band/artist albums based on unpublished material. (e.g., "Glenn Faria",  "Stonewall")
 Compilation albums based on unpublished material disguised as the debut album of a single band. (e.g., "Made From Plate")
 Bootleg re-issues of albums previously published on obscure labels. (e.g., "Sleepy Hollow")
 Bootleg albums based on live recordings. (e.g., "L.A Jail", "Reading Festival Featuring Rod Stewart") 
 Material recorded by bands/artists signed to Tiger Lily Records. (e.g., "Airborne", "Pressed For Time")
Record collector and music producer Stephan Colloredo-Mansfeld is said to own the largest collection of Tiger Lily releases in the world.

List of Records

References

External links

 - discography of the United States incarnation which includes a few items not featured in the Robert Plante discography.

Defunct record labels of the United States
Record labels established in 1976
Record labels disestablished in 1977